HD 121439, also known as HR 5240, is a solitary, bluish-white hued star located in the southern circumpolar constellation Apus. It has an apparent magnitude of 6.08, allowing it to be faintly visible to the naked eye. At its current distance, HD 121439's brightness is diminished by 0.57 magnitudes due to interstellar dust.

This is an evolved giant star with a stellar classification of B9 III. It has 3.26 times the mass of the Sun but has expanded to 5.6 times its girth. Based on extinction from the Gaia passband, HD 121439 has an iron abundance 1.65 times that of the Sun. This makes the object metal enriched.

References

B-type giants

Apus (constellation)
Apodis, 3

5240
CD-77 00626
121439
068431